William Rougham (died 1393) was the second master of Gonville Hall, Cambridge (later Gonville and Caius College) from c. 1360. He had been a fellow of the college since the 1350s and was Bachelor of Medicine by 1366. He was also a priest with livings in the Diocese of Norwich and was personal physician to Henry le Despenser, Bishop of Norwich.

In Susanna Gregory's 2004 book The Hand of Justice, which is set in 1350s Cambridge, there is a physician character known as "William Rougham of Gonville Hall".

Rougham's biggest contribution to the college was the completion of the chapel in 1353 which stood as he had left it for 250 years. The east window and one of the side windows contained, according to John Caius, an inscription reading:

Offices held

References

Masters of Gonville Hall, Cambridge
1393 deaths
Year of birth unknown